Eucalyptus filiformis is a species of mallee that is endemic to a small area on the side of a mountain in Victoria, Australia. It has rough fibrous or flaky bark on the trunk, smooth bark above, narrow lance-shaped to narrow elliptical adult leaves, flower buds usually in groups of seven, white flowers and barrel-shaped fruit.

Description
It has rough, fibrous to flaky, light grey bark on the trunk, smooth bark above. Flowering occurs in late autumn and the flowers are white.

Taxonomy and naming
Eucalyptus filiformis was first formally described in 2004 by Kevin Rule in the journal Muelleria from a specimen Rule collected on the southern slope of Mt. Jeffcott near Charlton. The specific epithet (filiformis) is derived from Latin filum meaning "thread" and forma meaning "shape", referring to the narrow juvenile leaves of this species.

Distribution and habitat
This mallee grows in shallow red soils and is only known from private property on the southern side of Mt Jeffcott.

See also
List of Eucalyptus species

References

Trees of Australia
filiformis
Myrtales of Australia
Plants described in 2004